Oskari Manninen (born April 22, 1991) is a Finnish professional ice hockey player. He is currently playing for KooKoo of the Finnish Liiga.

Manninen made his Liiga debut playing with Jokerit during the 2013-14 Liiga season.

References

External links

1991 births
Living people
Kiekko-Vantaa players
HPK players
Vaasan Sport players
Kokkolan Hermes players
Jokerit players
Finnish ice hockey defencemen
Rovaniemen Kiekko players
KooKoo players
Ice hockey people from Helsinki